Lior Kroyter (Hebrew: ליאור קרויטור; born 1980) is an Israeli badminton player. He was the men's and mixed doubles runner-up of the 2014 and 2015 Hatzor International tournament.

Achievements

BWF International Challenge/Series 
Men's doubles

Mixed doubles

  BWF International Challenge tournament
  BWF International Series tournament
  BWF Future Series tournament

References

External links 
 

1980 births
Place of birth missing (living people)
Living people
Israeli male badminton players
Maccabiah Games gold medalists for Israel
Competitors at the 2013 Maccabiah Games
Competitors at the 2017 Maccabiah Games
Maccabiah Games bronze medalists for Israel
Maccabiah Games medalists in badminton
21st-century Israeli people